The Ordinance of Alsnö was an act by king Magnus Ladulås of Sweden, probably produced in Alsnö hus in September 1280, giving exemption from land taxation to those nobles who committed to produce a heavy cavalryman to the king's service.  This established the frälse, the tax-exempt secular nobility in Sweden. 

Another, perhaps less pivotal but more widely known, article of this act reformed the peasants' obligation to accommodate traveling nobles, a privilege that was at the time abused to the point of gatecrashing. This is a popular explanation to the odd name Ladulås: He "put a lock" on "the barns".

See also
 History of Sweden
 Adelsö

1280s in law
Law of Sweden
1280 in Europe
13th century in Sweden